Gowalla is a location-based social networking service. It originally launched in 2007 and closed in 2012, but was relaunched on March 10, 2023. Users were able to check in at "Spots" in their local vicinity, either through a dedicated mobile application or through the mobile website. Checking-in would sometimes produce virtual "items" for the user, some of which were developed to be promotional tools for the game's partners. As of November 2010 there were approximately 600,000 users. In January 2021, Gowalla made an announcement that the app is coming back in 2022. 

At the start of December 2009 it was reported that Gowalla had raised $8.4 million in a round of venture capital funding led by Greylock Partners and angel investors Chris Sacca, Kevin Rose and Jason Calacanis. It was acquired by Facebook on December 2, 2011, for an undisclosed sum  Gowalla, Inc. was based in Downtown Austin, Texas. On March 10, 2012, Gowalla announced it would cease operation and users would be able to download their checkins, photos and lists soon. However, this seems to have fallen through, as the site was made unavailable before these histories could be downloaded.

Overview
Gowalla was a primarily mobile application that allowed users to check into locations that they visited using their mobile device. This was done either through the use of dedicated applications available on Google Android, iPhone, Windows Phone, Palm WebOS, and BlackBerry, or via the service's mobile website. Check-ins could be pushed via Notifications to iPhones, and by linking accounts, to Twitter and Facebook.

"Trips", which as of January 2010  could be made by any user, linked together up to 20 related spots, grouped into categories such as Nature Hikes or Pub Crawls.

Some Spots and Trips were "featured" by Gowalla, being highlighted on their website and awarded a special status and icon. Featured spots tended to be local landmarks such as Buckingham Palace in London, while featured trips were chosen for being "unique and exciting". Within the Gowalla community, certain users had an elevated status above that of normal users. Whereas every user could create a spot and maintain its details, members of the Street Team were able to move and edit any unlocked spots. This included the ability to merge duplicate spots.

In early versions of the service, users would occasionally receive a virtual "Item" as a bonus upon checking in, and these items could be swapped or dropped at other spots. Users became "Founders" of a spot by dropping an item there. Items used to form a key feature within the game and each user had a vault into which they could place items they wanted to keep. In a September 2011 update, items and the user's vault became less of a focus of the application and were removed from the user experience. Many users were unhappy with the removal of Items.

On December 2, 2010, Gowalla released version 3.0 for the iPhone 4, allowing Gowalla users to check in using Foursquare, Facebook Places, Twitter, and Tumblr, or view friends' check-ins from other services. In March 2011 an Android version of Gowalla was released. This allowed the same features that applied to the iPhone 4 to be used on Android phones; it also updated the interface dramatically to introduce a new "Passport" look. In June 2011 a Windows Phone 7 version of Gowalla was released with a similar feature set.

The acquisition of Gowalla by Facebook was announced on December 2, 2011. Gowalla, as a service, was shut down on March 11, 2012. Gowalla stated that Facebook would not be acquiring any of Gowalla's user data.

On October 20, 2020 Josh Williams announced a return of Gowalla with a new concept for Spring 2021. The revamped app was released on the iPhone on March 10, 2023.

Awards
Gowalla won the Mobile category in the 2010 South by Southwest Interactive awards.

See also

 Geosocial networking
 Location-based service

References

Android (operating system) software
IOS software
Geosocial networking
Internet properties established in 2007
Internet properties disestablished in 2012
Meta Platforms acquisitions
2011 mergers and acquisitions
Mobile social software
Outdoor locating games